A by-election was held in the Dáil Éireann Longford–Westmeath constituency in Ireland on Friday, 23 May 2014, following the death of Fine Gael Teachta Dála (TD) Nicky McFadden on 25 March 2014. It was held on the same day as the 2014 European and local elections, and the Dublin West by-election.

The Electoral (Amendment) Act 2011 stipulates that a by-election in Ireland must be held within six months of a vacancy occurring.

Fine Gael candidate Gabrielle McFadden, sister of the deceased, was elected on the seventh count.

Result

See also
List of Dáil by-elections
Dáil constituencies

References

2014 in Irish politics
2014 elections in the Republic of Ireland
31st Dáil
By-elections in the Republic of Ireland
Elections in County Longford
Elections in County Westmeath
May 2014 events in Europe